Nicolas Meister and Eric Quigley were the defending champions but chose not to defend their title.

David O'Hare and Joe Salisbury won the title after defeating Jeevan Nedunchezhiyan and Christopher Rungkat 6–7(6–8), 6–3, [11–9] in the final.

Seeds

Draw

References
 Main Draw
 Qualifying Draw

RBC Tennis Championships of Dallas - Doubles